Charter College may refer to:
 Charter College (United States), a network of for-profit colleges in the United States
 Charter College (South Africa), a secondary school in South Africa